was a town in the Nishikubiki District of Niigata Prefecture in Japan.

As of 2003, the town had an estimated population of 10,266 and a population density of 68.22 persons per km². The total area was 150.49 km².

On March 19, 2005, Nō, along with the town of Ōmi (also in Nishikubiki District), was merged into the expanded city of Itoigawa.

External links
  

Dissolved municipalities of Niigata Prefecture
Itoigawa, Niigata